Mir wëlle bleiwe wat mir sinn (Luxembourgish for "We want to stay what we are"; archaic spelling Mir wölle bleiwe wat mir sin) is the national motto of Luxembourg. The national motto is also translated into the other two official languages, French and German, although they do not have the status of a national language: "Nous voulons rester ce que nous sommes" (French) and "Wir wollen bleiben, was wir sind" (German). It refers to the ambition of the Luxembourgish people to retain their independent identity and sovereignty.

Origin and history
The phrase's origin can be traced back to De Feierwon, a patriotic song written in 1859 to pay homage to the country's first international (cross-border) railway. Its chorus reads:

Kommt hier aus Frankräich, Belgie, Preisen,
Mir wellen iech ons Hémecht weisen,
Frot dir no alle Säiten hin,
Mir welle bleiwe wat mir sin.
 
In English, this reads:
Come here from France, Belgium, Prussia, 
we want to show you our fatherland
ask in all directions, 
We want to stay what we are.

References

National mottos
National symbols of Luxembourg